Pseudopungtungia is a genus of cyprinid fish found in Korea and China.  There are only two described species in this genus.

Species
 Pseudopungtungia nigra T. Mori, 1935 (Black shinner)
 Pseudopungtungia tenuicorpus S. R. Jeon & K. C. Choi, 1980 (Slender shinner)

References
 

 
Cyprinid fish of Asia
Cyprinidae genera
Taxa named by Tamezo Mori